Jorge Ureña Andreu (born 8 October 1993 in Onil) is a Spanish athlete competing in the combined events. He won the silver medal at the 2015 European U23 Championships. In addition, he finished seventh at the 2015 European Indoor Championships.

Competition record

Personal bests
Outdoor
100 metres – 10.66 (+1.0 m/s) (Tokyo 2021)
400 metres – 48.00 (Tokyo 2021)
1500 metres – 4:24.12 (Monzón 2017)
110 metres hurdles – 13.88 (+0.7 m/s) (Lutsk 2017)
400 metres hurdles – 55.02 (Gandía 2013)
High jump – 2.09 (La Nucía 2019)
Pole vault – 5.10 (Soria 2019)
Long jump – 7.59 (+1.4 m/s) (Alhama de Murcia 2021)
Shot put – 14.50 (Alhama de Murcia 2021) 
Discus throw – 43.70 (Tokyo 2021) 
Javelin throw – 64.02 (Arona 2015)
Decathlon – 8322 (Tokyo 2021)
Indoor
60 metres – 6.79 (Madrid 2023)
200 metres – 22.58 (Valencia 2015)
1000 metres – 2:40.06 (Antequera 2015)
60 metres hurdles – 7.78 (Belgrade 2017 & Glasgow 2019)
High jump – 2.11 (Ourense 2020)
Pole vault – 5.05 (Ourense 2022)
Long jump – 7.73 (Antequera 2019)
Shot put – 14.84 (Valencia 2021)
Heptathlon – 6249 (Praha 2017) NR

References

External links

 
 
 
 

1993 births
Living people
People from Alcoià
Sportspeople from the Province of Alicante
Spanish decathletes
World Athletics Championships athletes for Spain
European Athletics Indoor Championships winners
Athletes (track and field) at the 2020 Summer Olympics
Olympic athletes of Spain